Steigen ('stejgen) is a municipality in Nordland county, Norway. It is part of the traditional district of Salten. The administrative centre of the municipality is the village of Leinesfjord. Other villages include Bogen, Leines, Nordfold, Nordskot, and Sørskot. Engeløy Airport, Grådussan is located in the northern part of the municipality. Måløy–Skarholmen Lighthouse is located in the Vestfjorden in the western part of the municipality. The only road access to the municipality is via the Steigen Tunnel.

The  municipality is the 114th largest by area out of the 356 municipalities in Norway. Steigen is the 246th most populous municipality in Norway with a population of 2,591.

General information
The municipality of Steigen was established on 1 January 1838 (see formannskapsdistrikt law). The southern part of Steigen was separated on 1 September 1900 to form the new Ledingen Municipality. This left 2,216 residents in Steigen.

During the 1960s, there were many municipal mergers across Norway due to the work of the Schei Committee. On 1 January 1964 a major municipal merger took place. A new municipality Steigen was created by the merging the following areas:
all of Steigen Municipality (population: 1,829)
all of Leiranger Municipality (population: 1,397)
most of Nordfold Municipality except the Mørsvikbotn area (population: 1,212)
the small Brennsund area of Kjerringøy Municipality (population: 30)
the part of Hamarøy Municipality that was south of the Sagfjorden and between the lake Storvatnet and the Veggfjellan mountain (population: 77)
Prior to the merger, the population of Steigen was 1,843, and after the merger, the new municipality had 4,545 residents.

Name
The municipality (originally the parish) is named after the old Steigen farm since the first Steigen Church was built there. The name is derived from the verb  which means "mount" or "rise". This is referring to the high and steep mountain Steigtinden (tinden means "the peak") behind the farm.

Coat of arms
The coat of arms was granted on 12 October 1988, but they were not formally approved by the government until 11 January 1991. The official blazon is "Or three axe blades sable in bend". This means the arms have a field (background) that has a tincture of Or which means it is commonly colored yellow, but if it is made out of metal, then gold is used. The charge is three axe heads from the Viking Age that are lined up diagonally. The design was chosen to represent the Viking history of the municipality. There are three axe heads to represent that three municipalities were merged in 1964 to form the present municipality. The arms were designed by Henry Tømmerås, the municipal cultural secretary at the time.

Churches
The Church of Norway has three parishes within the municipality of Steigen. It is part of the Salten prosti (deanery) in the Diocese of Sør-Hålogaland.

Geography

Steigen borders Hamarøy Municipality in the north and Sørfold Municipality to the south. The Vestfjorden and Lofoten are located west of Steigen. The Sagfjorden lies on the north and the Folda fjord in the south.

The municipality is mainly located on a peninsula dissected by many fjords. Steigen also includes several islands. The largest island is Engeløya, where there are ancient burial mounds (such as Sigarshaugen) and the world's most northerly naturally occurring Hazel forest in Prestegårdsskogen Nature Reserve. The largest glacier is Helldalsisen encircling a  mountain. The island of Engeløya is connected to the mainland by the Engeløy Bridges and just to the north of that lies the uninhabited island of Lundøya.

Steigen has fertile lowlands in between the mountains and the sea. There are several archeological sites showing settlements from the Bronze Age, Iron Age, and Viking Age. Lakes in the region include Forsanvatnet, Hopvatnet, Makkvatnet, and Straumfjordvatnet.

Climate

Government
All municipalities in Norway, including Steigen, are responsible for primary education (through 10th grade), outpatient health services, senior citizen services, unemployment and other social services, zoning, economic development, and municipal roads. The municipality is governed by a municipal council of elected representatives, which in turn elect a mayor.  The municipality falls under the Salten District Court and the Hålogaland Court of Appeal.

Municipal council
The municipal council of Steigen is made up of 17 representatives that are elected to four year terms. The party breakdown of the council is as follows:

Mayor
The mayors of Steigen:

1838–1839: Christian B. Stoltenberg
1839–1840: Hans P. Meisler
1840–1847: Martin Adolph Sigholt 
1848–1851: Thomas Aagesen
1852–1864: Peder Hansen 
1865–1868: Fredrik Nikolai Jensen 
1869–1870: Thomas Aagesen 
1871–1878: Peder Hansen
1878–1879: Jonas Svensen
1879–1880: Gerhard Schøning
1881–1884: Johan C.R. Wisløff
1885–1886: Ole Nilssen
1887–1892: Johan C.R. Wisløff
1893–1894: Lars Fremmerlid 
1895–1896: Peter M. Kristiansen 
1897–1901: Kristian B. Kristensen
1902-1913: Søren S. Svendsen
1914-1916: Hartvig Olsen 
1917-1928: Søren S. Svendsen
1929-1931: Peder Hansen 
1932-1937: Søren S. Svendsen
1938-1941: Sigurd Vik (NS)
1941-1945: Johan Beck (NS)
1945-1945: Jakob Aalstad 
1946-1955: Gudmund Storsæther (LL)
1956-1959: Ludvig Fjellbakk (Ap)
1960-1963: Sverre Kristiansen (Ap)
1964-1965: Trygve Aasjord (H)
1966-1967: Erling J. Vindenes (V)
1968-1971: Johan O. Skjelstad (Ap)
1972-1979: Jan A. Laxaa (Sp)
1980-1985: Tor Johan Aalstad (Sp)
1985-1991: Ragnar Kildahl (Sp)
1991-1999: Svein Benoni (Sp)
1999-2003: Arne Marhaug (Ap)
2003-2007: Berit Woie Berg (V)
2007-2019: Asle Schrøder (Sp)
2019–present: Aase Refsnes (SV)

Notable people 
 Marit Elveos (born 1965 in Steigen) a Norwegian cross-country skier, competed at the 1988 Winter Olympics
 Tom Erik Breive (born 1980 in Steigen) a retired Norwegian football midfielder with over 100 club caps

References

External links

Municipal fact sheet from Statistics Norway 
Steigen Municipality 
Treveven:Hassel 
Iron Age in Steigen
Steigen settled for thousands of years

 
Municipalities of Nordland
Populated places of Arctic Norway
1838 establishments in Norway